Justice League: Gods and Monsters Chronicles is a 2015 animated superhero web series featuring Justice League characters from DC Comics. It first aired on June 8, 2015, on Machinima, a multi-channel network, and was developed by DC Entertainment, Warner Bros. Animation, and Blue Ribbon Content. The series serves as a companion to the animated film Justice League: Gods and Monsters. The first season consisted of three episodes and concluded on June 12, 2015.

Although Machinima and Warner Bros. announced that the series was renewed for a second season, which was scheduled to be released in 2016 and have ten episodes, series creator Sam Liu reported that the series was shelved until things are worked out and that he is working on other projects.

Plot
This web series takes place in the alternate reality of Justice League: Gods and Monsters. Each of the initial three episodes showcases one of the film's major characters: Batman, Superman, and Wonder Woman.

Cast

Main
 Michael C. Hall as Kirk Langstrom / Batman (Ep. 1)
 Benjamin Bratt as Hernan Guerra / Superman (Ep. 2)
 Tamara Taylor as Bekka / Wonder Woman (Ep. 3)

Guest
 Paget Brewster as Lois Lane (ep. 2)
 Daniel Hagen as Doctor Sivana (ep. 2)
 Penny Johnson Jerald as President Amanda Waller (ep. 2)
 Josh Keaton as White House Aide (ep. 2), Kobra Guard (ep. 3)
 Tahmoh Penikett as Steve Trevor (ep. 3)
 Tara Strong as Harley Quinn (ep. 1), Brainiac (ep. 2)
 Bruce Thomas as Kobra (ep. 3)

Crew
 Wes Gleason – Casting and Voice Director

Episodes

Development
The series of shorts which debuted on the Machinima YouTube channel, which were developed to tie into the 2015 animated film Justice League: Gods and Monsters. These shorts ran the month before the release of the film and each episode focuses on one of the three main characters: Batman, Superman, and Wonder Woman. The first season's three episodes were released on June 8, 10, and 12, 2015.

The series is the first collaboration between Warner Bros. and Machinima, following the former's investment of $18 million in Machinima in March 2014. The series is also the first production of Blue Ribbon Content, a digital content production unit of Warner Bros. formed in 2014 and led by president of Warner Bros. Animation Sam Register.

Reception

References

External links
 

2015 web series debuts
2015 web series endings
2010s American adult animated television series
American adult animated drama television series
American adult animated science fiction television series
American adult animated superhero television series
American adult animated web series
Television series by Warner Bros. Animation
Television series by Blue Ribbon Content
Adult animated television shows based on DC Comics